The Scythian campaign of Darius I was a military expedition into parts of European Scythia by Darius I, the king of the Achaemenid Empire, in 513 BC. The Scythians were an East Iranian-speaking people who had invaded Media, revolted against Darius and threatened to disrupt trade between Central Asia and the shores of the Black Sea as they lived between the Danube and Don Rivers and the Black Sea. The campaigns took place in parts of what is now the Balkans, Ukraine, and southern Russia.

The Scythians managed to avoid a direct confrontation with the Persian army due to their mobile lifestyle and lack of any settlement (except Gelonus), while the Persians suffered losses due to the Scythians' scorched earth tactic. However, the Persians conquered much of their cultivated lands and damaged their allies, forcing the Scythians to respect the Persian force. Darius halted the advance to consolidate his gains, and built a defence line.

The campaign

Darius crossed the Black Sea at the Bosphorus Straits using a bridge of boats. Darius conquered large portions of Eastern Europe, even crossing the Danube to wage war on the Scythians. Darius invaded Scythia with his general Megabazus, where the Scythians evaded Darius's army, using feints and retreating eastwards while laying waste to the countryside, by blocking wells, intercepting convoys, destroying pastures and continuous skirmishes against Darius's army. Seeking to fight with the Scythians, Darius's army chased the Scythian army deep into Scythian lands, mostly in what is modern-day Ukraine, where there were no cities to conquer and no supplies to forage. In frustration Darius sent a letter to the Scythian ruler Idanthyrsus to fight or surrender. The ruler replied that he would not stand and fight with Darius, unless the Persians found and desecrated the graves of the Scythians' forefathers. Until then, they would continue their strategy as they had no cities or cultivated lands to lose. Despite the evading tactics of the Scythians, Darius' campaign was so far relatively successful. As presented by Herodotus, the tactics of the Scythians resulted in the loss of their best lands and damage to their loyal allies. The fact is thus that Darius held the initiative. As he moved eastwards in the cultivated lands of the Scythians, he remained resupplied by his fleet and lived to an extent off of the land.

While moving eastwards in the European Scythian lands, he captured Gelonos, the large fortified city of the Budini, one of the allies of the Scythians, and burnt it.

Towards the end of the campaign

Darius ordered a halt at the banks of Oarus, where he built "eight great forts, some eight miles distant from each other", no doubt as a frontier defence. As A. Fol and N. G. L. Hammond state, this evidently was as far eastwards as Darius intended to go, at least for the time being. After chasing the Scythians for a month, Darius's army was suffering losses due to fatigue, privation and sickness. In his Histories, Herodotus states that the ruins of the forts were still standing in his day. Concerned about losing more of his troops, Darius halted the march at the banks of the Volga River and headed towards Thrace. He had failed to bring the Scythians to a direct battle, and until he did so he did not have much reason to secure the conquered territories. The initiative still lay with him. As the tactics of evading Darius' army and scorched earth were continued by the Scythians, they had failed however completely, though Darius had failed too as still he wasn't able to bring it to a direct confrontation. He had conquered enough Scythian territory to force the Scythians to respect the Persian forces.

Further reasons behind the invasion past the Danube

The whole area from central Thrace to Georgia and from Ukraine to the north-east Mediterranean formed a compact area with mutual economic interests between Scythians, Thracians or Ionians, and Iranians. In strategic terms, Darius must have seen that some Scythian-type peoples extended from Ukraine all the way to what is modern-day Uzbekistan, forming a continuum of dangerous nomadic raiders. Furthermore, control of the Black Sea recognized no international divisions. The Persians and the Greeks (many of whom lived in the Persian Empire, while another number lived in the Greek colonies in what is nowadays southern Ukraine) had a common interest in seeking to control the source of Scythian exports of gold, grain, hides, and furs. As Fol and Hammond further state, Ctesias, a Greek doctor at the Persian court ca. 400 BC, wrote that before the invasion of Darius into the European Scythian lands a satrap of Cappadocia named Ariaramnes had crossed the Black Sea to the north, raiding the European Scythian regions with a fleet of thirty penteconters, returning with Scythian men and women, including the brother of a Scythian king.

While some have supposed that the reason for Darius' invasions was merely to destroy the Scythian lands, the erection of a bridge over the Hellespont contradicts this; his superior fleet could have easily shipped the troops over as the Scythians had no navy at all.

Date of the invasion
Though Herodotus does not mention the season of the year, as Fol and Hammond write, it is possible to infer it, knowing that if Darius marched from Susa in spring 513 BC, he would have reached Chalcedon in May, and mustered his forces on the European side in June. Thus, he may have started to go beyond the Danube in late August.

Aftermath

Darius inflicted widespread damage on the Scythians and their allies, weakened the prestige of the Royal Scythians especially, and upset the balance of power among the various peoples of the region. But because he failed to bring the Scythians to battle, he was unable to secure any territorial gains and he did not even complete the building of the forts at what could have been a frontier. The campaign was little more than an expensive stalemate. As winter now had come, Darius did not return to attack, and marched towards Thrace, towards his firmly secured territories.

Some form of Persian authority perhaps remained after Darius withdrew, for the "Scythians across the Sea" (Old Persian cuneiform: 𐎿𐎣𐎠𐏐𐎫𐎹𐎡𐎹𐏐𐎱𐎼𐎭𐎼𐎹, Sakā tayaiya paradraya) are mentioned at Naqsh-e Rustam as one of the peoples the king conquered outside of Persia.

Assessment
The Scythian campaign was decisive in that the Persians abandoned the attempt to subjugate the European Scythians. Herodotus was correct in his assessment that the Scythians owed their escape to their mobility, their lack of inhabited centres, and the skill of their mounted archers. He furthermore states that their refusal to submit to Persia was due to such factors as the authoritarian power of the kings, the widespread hatred of foreigners (IV.76.1), and the ordinary man's belief that what brought him and his tribe honour was the killing of enemies. The various Scythian tribes co-operated with each other, winning support of other neighboring peoples as well. In that regard, they showed more of a sense of a community than the Greek city-states were to show through much of the subsequent Greco-Persian Wars.

See also
Scythia
History of Ukraine
History of the Balkans
Gherla
Achaemenid Macedonia
First Persian invasion of Greece
Gog and Magog

References

Sources

Further reading
 The Cambridge Ancient History, Volume 10 - IV Persia, Greece and the Western Mediterranean, pp 66–67

513 BC
6th-century BC conflicts
History of Europe
Ancient history of the Balkans
Wars involving the Achaemenid Empire
6th century BC in Iran
Darius
Ancient history of Ukraine
Ancient history of Romania
Ancient Russia
Ancient Bulgaria
Skudra
Darius the Great